WKJL (88.1 FM) is a Contemporary Christian formatted broadcast radio station licensed to Clarksburg, West Virginia, serving North-Central West Virginia.

WKJL is owned and operated by Educational Media Foundation (EMF), and broadcasts EMF's K-LOVE format.

External links
 K-LOVE Online
 

Contemporary Christian radio stations in the United States
Radio stations established in 1993
K-Love radio stations
1993 establishments in West Virginia
Educational Media Foundation radio stations
KJL